Jesse John Bochco (born March 2, 1975) is an American television director and producer. He is the son of television producer/writer Steven Bochco and actress Barbara Bosson.

Career
In 1982, Bochco had his first and only acting role as Frank Furillo Jr. on the series Hill Street Blues, produced by his father. He played the son of Fay Furillo, Barbara Bosson's character.

Bochco began his behind-the-camera career as an associate producer on his father's television series Philly (2001–2002) starring Kim Delaney. He made his directorial debut on that series with the episode "Tall Tales" in 2002. He went on to direct episodes of NYPD Blue, Over There, Commander in Chief and Raising the Bar, all produced by his father. His other television directing credits include Dirt, Lincoln Heights, Standoff, John from Cincinnati, The Closer, Prison Break, Nip/Tuck, Marvel's Agents of S.H.I.E.L.D., and Dallas.

Personal life
Since 2009, Bochco has been married to actress Kate Danson, the daughter of actor Ted Danson and his second wife Cassandra Coates.

References

External links

20th-century American Jews
American television directors
Television producers from California
Living people
People from Los Angeles
1975 births
21st-century American Jews